In mathematics, modular forms are particular complex analytic functions on the upper half-plane of interest in complex analysis and number theory. When reduced modulo a prime p, there is an analogous theory to the classical theory of complex modular forms and the p-adic theory of modular forms.

Reduction of modular forms modulo 2

Conditions to reduce modulo 2
Modular forms are analytic functions, so they admit a Fourier series.
So if  is a modular form, then there are coefficients  such that .
To reduce modulo 2, consider the subspace of modular forms with coefficients of the -series being all integers (since complex numbers, in general, may not be reduced modulo 2).
It is then possible to reduce all coefficients modulo 2, which will give a modular form modulo 2.

Basis for modular forms modulo 2
This gives generators for modular forms, which may be reduced modulo 2.
Note the Miller basis has some interesting properties 
That is, a trivial reduction.
To get a non-trivial reduction, mathematicians use the modular discriminant .

The modular discriminant modulo 2
The modular discriminant is defined by an infinite product:
 
The coefficients that matches are usually denoted , and correspond to the Ramanujan tau function.
Results from Kolberg and Jean-Pierre Serre allows to show that modulo 2, we have:

Hecke operators modulo 2
Hecke operators are commonly considered as the most important operators acting on modular forms.
It is therefore justified to try to reduce them modulo 2.

The Hecke operators for a modular form  are defined as follows

Hecke operators may be defined on the -series as follows:
if , 
then  
with

Since modular forms were reduced using the -series, it makes sense to use the -series definition. The sum simplifies a lot for Hecke operators of primes (i.e. when  is prime): there are only two summands. This is very nice for reduction modulo 2, as the formula simplifies a lot.
With more than two summands, there would be many cancellations modulo 2, and the legitimacy of the process would be doubtable. Thus, Hecke operators modulo 2 are usually defined only for primes numbers.

 

It is important to note that Hecke operators modulo 2 have the interesting property of being nilpotent.
Finding their order of nilpotency is a problem solved by Jean-Pierre Serre and Jean-Louis Nicolas in a paper published in 2012:.

The Hecke algebra modulo 2
The Hecke algebra may also be reduced modulo 2.

Following Serre and Nicolas's notations from
, i.e. .

Finally, define the Hecke algebra  as follows:
As  is either identity or zero, .
Therefore, the following chain is obtained:
.
Explicitly, this means
.

That is:
.

So for any prime , it is possible to find coefficients  such that:

References 

Modular forms
Algebraic number theory